Papas Fritas is the debut album by Papas Fritas, released in 1995 on the Minty Fresh record label.

Critical reception
Trouser Press editor Ira Robbins wrote that the group "...turns extraordinarily fetching pop concoctions like 'Lame to Be,' 'TV Movies,' 'Possibilities' and 'Smash This World' into disarmingly sophisticated and diverse small-scale charmers with abundant skill and no evidence of effort."

Track listing
"Guys Don't Lie" (Shivika Asthana, Tony Goddess) – 2:39
"Holiday" (Goddess) – 2:49
"Wild Life" (Goddess) – 3:16
"Passion Play" (Goddess) – 3:04
"TV Movies" (Asthana, Goddess) – 3:58
"My Revolution" (Keith Gendel) – 2:45
"Kids Don't Mind" (Asthana, Gendel, Goddess) – 0:51
"Smash This World" (Goddess) – 2:49
"Lame to Be" (Asthana, Goddess) – 2:48
"Possibilities" (Asthana, Gendel, Goddess) – 2:21
"My Own Girlfriend" (Goddess) – 1:59
"Explain" (Goddess) – 3:41
"Afterall" (Goddess) – 3:07

Personnel
 Shivika Asthana: drums, vocals
 Keith Gendel: bass, vocals
 Tony Goddess: guitar, piano, vocals

Production notes
String arrangement on "Passion Play" by Tom Swafford (Swafford and Kathleen Derbyshire, violins; Heather Morehouse, viola; Sarah Thompson, cello). Engineered by Paul Sanni at Hi-Tech City (Somerville, Mass.). Mixed by Paul Q. Kolderie and Sean Slade at Fort Apache (Cambridge, Mass). Mastered by Roger Siebel at SAE (Phoenix, Ariz.). Photography by Anna Rappaport and Tim Leanse. Protection by Michael Hafitz. Thanks to Matt Hanks and Sunday Driver Records.

References

1995 albums